IFFCO GROUP, established in 1975, is a business house based in the United Arab Emirates. It is part of the Allana group, one of the largest producers

 and retailers of processed food products and agro commodities. IFFCO started manufacturing in 1980, and diversified into marketing and brand building in the 1990s. By 2000, the company was focused on enhancing brand value and equity, in 2010 it was reaching out to new markets, and in 2021 IFFCO was ranked 15th Top Global Specialty Oil Company by FoodTalks.

References

Food and drink companies of the United Arab Emirates
Retail companies established in 1975
Emirati companies established in 1975
Food and drink companies established in 1975